Etielloides sejunctella is a species of snout moth in the genus Etielloides. It was described by Hugo Theodor Christoph in 1881 and is known from China, Japan and the Russian Far East.

References

Moths described in 1881
Phycitinae
Moths of Japan